The 2019 League of Ireland Cup, also known for sponsorship reasons as the 2019 EA Sports Cup, was the 46th season of the League of Ireland's secondary knockout competition. The EA Sports Cup featured teams from the SSE Airtricity League Premier and First Divisions, as well as some intermediate level teams. Dundalk defeated Derry City in the final in a penalty shoot-out, following a 2-2 draw.

The competition structure was altered for 2019 with all Premier Division entering at the second round stage.

Preliminary round

First round

All ten teams from the League of Ireland First Division as well as one representative from the Leinster Senior League and one representative from the Ulster Senior League entered the competition at this stage. The draw for the first round was made on 20 February 2019 with fixtures set for 4 and 5 March 2019. The game between Cobh Ramblers and Limerick was postponed until 18 March 2019 due to inclement weather on the original date

Second round

All ten League of Ireland Premier Division clubs entered at this stage of the competition. The draw for the second round was made on 12 March 2019 with fixtures taking place on 1/2 April 2019.

Quarter-final

The draw for the quarter final was made on 8 April 2019 with fixtures taking place on Monday, 27 May 2019.

Semi-final
The draw for the semi final was made on 28 May 2019. Both matches were scheduled to be played on 5 August 2019. The fixture between Dundalk and Bohemians was postponed until 19 August due to Dundalk's involvement in the UEFA Champions League.

Final

References

Cup
3
League of Ireland Cup seasons